The 1971–72 Philadelphia Flyers season was the Philadelphia Flyers' fifth season in the National Hockey League (NHL). The Flyers missed the playoffs for the second time in three years.

Off-season
The Flyers fired head coach Vic Stasiuk on May 27, 1971, after heavy criticism by Flyers players. On June 2, the Flyers hired Fred Shero to replace him. In the previous two seasons Shero had guided two teams to league championships, the Buffalo Bisons of the American Hockey League and the Omaha Knights of the Central Hockey League.

Regular season
Bobby Clarke continued to progress as he led the team in goals (35), assists (46), and points (81) in 1971–72 and he became the first Flyer to win an NHL award, the Bill Masterton Memorial Trophy for perseverance, sportsmanship and dedication to hockey. However, in the season's final game, the Flyers needed a win or a tie against the second-year Buffalo Sabres to beat out the Pittsburgh Penguins for the final playoff spot. The score was tied late in the game, but with just four seconds on the clock, former Flyer Gerry Meehan took a shot from just inside the blue line that eluded Flyers goalie Doug Favell. With identical records, the playoff berth went to the Penguins because Philly lost the season series 2–3–1.

Season standings

Schedule and results

Regular season

|- style="background:#fcf;"
| 1 || October 9 || @ Pittsburgh Penguins || 2–3 || 0–1–0 || 0 || 
|- style="background:#fcf;"
| 2 || October 12 || @ Vancouver Canucks || 2–3 || 0–2–0 || 0 || 
|- style="background:#cfc;"
| 3 || October 13 || @ California Golden Seals || 5–4 || 1–2–0 || 2 || 
|- style="background:#cfc;"
| 4 || October 16 || @ Los Angeles Kings || 1–0 || 2–2–0 || 4 || 
|- style="background:#fcf;"
| 5 || October 21 || Los Angeles Kings || 0–7 || 2–3–0 || 4 || 
|- style="background:#fcf;"
| 6 || October 23 || @ Toronto Maple Leafs || 3–5 || 2–4–0 || 4 || 
|- style="background:#cfc;"
| 7 || October 24 || Chicago Black Hawks || 2–1 || 3–4–0 || 6 || 
|- style="background:#cfc;"
| 8 || October 28 || Vancouver Canucks || 3–2 || 4–4–0 || 8 || 
|- style="background:#ffc;"
| 9 || October 30 || @ St. Louis Blues || 4–4 || 4–4–1 || 9 || 
|- style="background:#cfc;"
| 10 || October 31 || Montreal Canadiens || 5–3 || 5–4–1 || 11 || 
|-

|- style="background:#fcf;"
| 11 || November 3 || @ Chicago Black Hawks || 0–3 || 5–5–1 || 11 || 
|- style="background:#fcf;"
| 12 || November 5 || @ Buffalo Sabres || 2–5 || 5–6–1 || 11 || 
|- style="background:#fcf;"
| 13 || November 7 || Minnesota North Stars || 0–3 || 5–7–1 || 11 || 
|- style="background:#cfc;"
| 14 || November 11 || Vancouver Canucks || 4–3 || 6–7–1 || 13 || 
|- style="background:#fcf;"
| 15 || November 13 || Detroit Red Wings || 3–6 || 6–8–1 || 13 || 
|- style="background:#ffc;"
| 16 || November 14 || Toronto Maple Leafs || 3–3 || 6–8–2 || 14 || 
|- style="background:#cfc;"
| 17 || November 18 || Los Angeles Kings || 2–0 || 7–8–2 || 16 || 
|- style="background:#ffc;"
| 18 || November 20 || @ Montreal Canadiens || 2–2 || 7–8–3 || 17 || 
|- style="background:#ffc;"
| 19 || November 21 || Minnesota North Stars || 1–1 || 7–8–4 || 18 || 
|- style="background:#fcf;"
| 20 || November 24 || Boston Bruins || 1–2 || 7–9–4 || 18 || 
|- style="background:#fcf;"
| 21 || November 25 || @ Boston Bruins || 2–4 || 7–10–4 || 18 || 
|- style="background:#fcf;"
| 22 || November 28 || New York Rangers || 2–4 || 7–11–4 || 18 || 
|-

|- style="background:#ffc;"
| 23 || December 2 || Detroit Red Wings || 1–1 || 7–11–5 || 19 || 
|- style="background:#fcf;"
| 24 || December 4 || @ Minnesota North Stars || 1–3 || 7–12–5 || 19 || 
|- style="background:#cfc;"
| 25 || December 5 || California Golden Seals || 3–0 || 8–12–5 || 21 || 
|- style="background:#fcf;"
| 26 || December 9 || New York Rangers || 0–5 || 8–13–5 || 21 || 
|- style="background:#fcf;"
| 27 || December 11 || @ Detroit Red Wings || 3–6 || 8–14–5 || 21 || 
|- style="background:#cfc;"
| 28 || December 12 || Montreal Canadiens || 4–1 || 9–14–5 || 23 || 
|- style="background:#fcf;"
| 29 || December 15 || @ New York Rangers || 2–6 || 9–15–5 || 23 || 
|- style="background:#cfc;"
| 30 || December 16 || Buffalo Sabres || 5–0 || 10–15–5 || 25 || 
|- style="background:#fcf;"
| 31 || December 19 || Toronto Maple Leafs || 0–4 || 10–16–5 || 25 || 
|- style="background:#fcf;"
| 32 || December 25 || @ Boston Bruins || 1–5 || 10–17–5 || 25 || 
|- style="background:#cfc;"
| 33 || December 26 || Pittsburgh Penguins || 6–1 || 11–17–5 || 27 || 
|- style="background:#fcf;"
| 34 || December 29 || @ New York Rangers || 1–5 || 11–18–5 || 27 || 
|-

|- style="background:#ffc;"
| 35 || January 1 || @ St. Louis Blues || 4–4 || 11–18–6 || 28 || 
|- style="background:#fcf;"
| 36 || January 2 || @ Chicago Black Hawks || 2–6 || 11–19–6 || 28 || 
|- style="background:#fcf;"
| 37 || January 6 || St. Louis Blues || 2–3 || 11–20–6 || 28 || 
|- style="background:#ffc;"
| 38 || January 8 || @ Toronto Maple Leafs || 2–2 || 11–20–7 || 29 || 
|- style="background:#cfc;"
| 39 || January 9 || California Golden Seals || 10–3 || 12–20–7 || 31 || 
|- style="background:#fcf;"
| 40 || January 11 || @ Detroit Red Wings || 0–5 || 12–21–7 || 31 || 
|- style="background:#fcf;"
| 41 || January 15 || @ Pittsburgh Penguins || 2–4 || 12–22–7 || 31 || 
|- style="background:#ffc;"
| 42 || January 16 || Los Angeles Kings || 3–3 || 12–22–8 || 32 || 
|- style="background:#cfc;"
| 43 || January 20 || Chicago Black Hawks || 3–2 || 13–22–8 || 34 || 
|- style="background:#fcf;"
| 44 || January 22 || @ Los Angeles Kings || 2–4 || 13–23–8 || 34 || 
|- style="background:#fcf;"
| 45 || January 23 || @ California Golden Seals || 1–3 || 13–24–8 || 34 || 
|- style="background:#fcf;"
| 46 || January 27 || @ Boston Bruins || 2–4 || 13–25–8 || 34 || 
|- style="background:#fcf;"
| 47 || January 29 || Boston Bruins || 2–4 || 13–26–8 || 34 || 
|- style="background:#cfc;"
| 48 || January 30 || Pittsburgh Penguins || 4–0 || 14–26–8 || 36 || 
|-

|- style="background:#cfc;"
| 49 || February 3 || Detroit Red Wings || 5–4 || 15–26–8 || 38 || 
|- style="background:#cfc;"
| 50 || February 5 || @ Toronto Maple Leafs || 3–1 || 16–26–8 || 40 || 
|- style="background:#ffc;"
| 51 || February 6 || St. Louis Blues || 2–2 || 16–26–9 || 41 || 
|- style="background:#cfc;"
| 52 || February 8 || @ Vancouver Canucks || 3–1 || 17–26–9 || 43 || 
|- style="background:#fcf;"
| 53 || February 9 || @ California Golden Seals || 2–3 || 17–27–9 || 43 || 
|- style="background:#fcf;"
| 54 || February 12 || @ Minnesota North Stars || 1–5 || 17–28–9 || 43 || 
|- style="background:#ffc;"
| 55 || February 13 || @ Buffalo Sabres || 4–4 || 17–28–10 || 44 || 
|- style="background:#ffc;"
| 56 || February 16 || @ Chicago Black Hawks || 3–3 || 17–28–11 || 45 || 
|- style="background:#fcf;"
| 57 || February 17 || Boston Bruins || 1–4 || 17–29–11 || 45 || 
|- style="background:#fcf;"
| 58 || February 19 || @ Montreal Canadiens || 1–3 || 17–30–11 || 45 || 
|- style="background:#cfc;"
| 59 || February 20 || Toronto Maple Leafs || 3–1 || 18–30–11 || 47 || 
|- style="background:#fcf;"
| 60 || February 23 || @ New York Rangers || 3–4 || 18–31–11 || 47 || 
|- style="background:#fcf;"
| 61 || February 26 || @ Pittsburgh Penguins || 2–5 || 18–32–11 || 47 || 
|- style="background:#cfc;"
| 62 || February 27 || @ Detroit Red Wings || 3–1 || 19–32–11 || 49 || 
|-

|- style="background:#cfc;"
| 63 || March 2 || Minnesota North Stars || 3–0 || 20–32–11 || 51 || 
|- style="background:#cfc;"
| 64 || March 4 || St. Louis Blues || 6–2 || 21–32–11 || 53 || 
|- style="background:#fcf;"
| 65 || March 5 || Montreal Canadiens || 0–4 || 21–33–11 || 53 || 
|- style="background:#cfc;"
| 66 || March 8 || @ Vancouver Canucks || 6–5 || 22–33–11 || 55 || 
|- style="background:#cfc;"
| 67 || March 9 || @ Los Angeles Kings || 5–3 || 23–33–11 || 57 || 
|- style="background:#fcf;"
| 68 || March 11 || @ St. Louis Blues || 2–4 || 23–34–11 || 57 || 
|- style="background:#fcf;"
| 69 || March 13 || @ Montreal Canadiens || 1–2 || 23–35–11 || 57 || 
|- style="background:#ffc;"
| 70 || March 16 || Buffalo Sabres || 3–3 || 23–35–12 || 58 || 
|- style="background:#fcf;"
| 71 || March 18 || New York Rangers || 3–5 || 23–36–12 || 58 || 
|- style="background:#fcf;"
| 72 || March 23 || Chicago Black Hawks || 2–4 || 23–37–12 || 58 || 
|- style="background:#cfc;"
| 73 || March 25 || California Golden Seals || 3–0 || 24–37–12 || 60 || 
|- style="background:#cfc;"
| 74 || March 26 || Vancouver Canucks || 4–1 || 25–37–12 || 62 || 
|- style="background:#ffc;"
| 75 || March 28 || @ Minnesota North Stars || 2–2 || 25–37–13 || 63 || 
|- style="background:#cfc;"
| 76 || March 30 || Buffalo Sabres || 3–1 || 26–37–13 || 65 || 
|-

|- style="background:#ffc;"
| 77 || April 1 || Pittsburgh Penguins || 4–4 || 26–37–14 || 66 || 
|- style="background:#fcf;"
| 78 || April 2 || @ Buffalo Sabres || 2–3 || 26–38–14 || 66 || 
|-

|-
| Legend:

Player statistics

Scoring
 Position abbreviations: C = Center; D = Defense; G = Goaltender; LW = Left Wing; RW = Right Wing
  = Joined team via a transaction (e.g., trade, waivers, signing) during the season. Stats reflect time with the Flyers only.
  = Left team via a transaction (e.g., trade, waivers, release) during the season. Stats reflect time with the Flyers only.

Goaltending

Awards and records

Awards

Records

Among the team records set during the 1971–72 season was a 19 game winless streak on the road (15 losses and 4 ties) from October 23 to January 27. On October 31, Simon Nolet became the first Flyer to score three goals in a single period and four points in a single period, both franchise regular season records that have been matched but not exceeded several times, the earliest instance occurring on March 9, 1972 by Bill Flett for the goals record and Flett and Bobby Clarke for the points record. On January 9, the Flyers scored six power play goals during a game against the California Golden Seals, a mark which was later matched during the 1988–89 season.

Milestones

Transactions
The Flyers were involved in the following transactions from May 19, 1971, the day after the deciding game of the 1971 Stanley Cup Finals, through May 11, 1972, the day of the deciding game of the 1972 Stanley Cup Finals.

Trades

Players acquired

Players lost

Signings

Draft picks

Philadelphia's picks at the 1971 NHL Amateur Draft, which was held at the Queen Elizabeth Hotel in Montreal, Quebec, on June 10, 1971.

Farm teams
The Flyers were affiliated with the Richmond Robins of the AHL, the San Diego Gulls of the WHL, and the Jersey Devils and Salem Rebels of the EHL.

Notes

References
General
 
 
 
Specific

Philadelphia
Philadelphia
Philadelphia Flyers seasons
Philad
Philad